The YMCA of Greater Toronto is a charity organization working on social issues in the Greater Toronto Area (GTA).

In October 2008, and again in 2009, YMCA of Greater Toronto in Canada was named one of Greater Toronto's Top Employers by Mediacorp Canada Inc.

YMCA Peace Medal

The YMCA Peace Medal program recognizes individuals who are dedicated to building peace within their local community or other communities around the world.

The YMCA of Greater Toronto presents the peace medals to individuals each year during YMCA Peace Week.

In 2018, the first-ever President's Peace Medal was presented to professional basketball executive Masai Ujiri.

Recipients

2019

No Award Ceremony Held

2018

Masai Ujiri – Toronto Raptors president of basketball operations 
Dale Swift – Toronto Police Service constable 
Loizza Aquino – mental health activist and founder of Peace of Mind Canada  and co-founder of Student Mental Health Canada.

2017

Wali Shah – Poet Laureate for the city of Mississauga
Stronger Communities – youth-run community organization.
1999

 Gerhard Scholten – Activist with Council of Canadians

References

External links 

 Official website

Greater Toronto
Greater Toronto Area
Organizations based in Toronto
Youth organizations based in Canada